Henry Kirke White Welch (Jan 1, 1821–Nov 25, 1870) was an American lawyer and politician.

Welch, the oldest child of Dr. Archibald and Cynthia (Hyde) Welch, was born in Mansfield, Connecticut, Jan 1, 1821. He graduated from Yale College in 1842.  He taught in Brooklyn, Connecticut, from October 1842 to March, 1843, when an affection of the throat compelled him to desist. After a few months passed in Wethersfield, Connecticut, where his father then resided, he went to Georgia for his health.  In the autumn of 1844, he returned, but finding his throat still sensitive, went South again, and spent the next two years teaching in Montgomery, Alabama, at the same time studying law.  During the winter of 1846–7 he read law in Brooklyn, Conn., with his uncle, Jonathan A. Welch.  He afterwards spent two years in the Law Department of Yale, and received the degree of LL. B. He was admitted to the bar in March, 1850, and in June opened an office in Hartford, Connecticut, where he resided, engaged in the practice of his profession, until his death He was a member of the Connecticut State Senate in 1862 and of the Connecticut House of Representatives in 1864 and 1865.

Welch married, March 24, 1852, Miss Frances Louisa, youngest daughter of Professor C. A. Goodrich, of Yale College.  His wife died Dec 2, 1855; and he remarried three years later, Miss Susan L. Goodwin, of Hartford, who survived him with four sons and a daughter. The sudden death of his youngest boy, Nov. 15, is believed to have brought on the illness which caused his own death, Nov 25, 1870, at the age of 49.

Yale College alumni
1821 births
1870 deaths
People from Mansfield, Connecticut
Connecticut lawyers
Connecticut state senators
Members of the Connecticut House of Representatives
19th-century American politicians
Politicians from Hartford, Connecticut
Lawyers from Hartford, Connecticut
19th-century American lawyers